The 2012 Wellington Sevens was part of the 2011–12 IRB Sevens World Series and was the 13th edition of the tournament, hosted at Wellington, New Zealand's Westpac Stadium.

New Zealand won the title by defeating Fiji 24–7 in the final.

Format
The teams were divided into pools of four teams, who played a round-robin within the pool. Points were awarded in each pool on a different schedule from most rugby tournaments—3 for a win, 2 for a draw, 1 for a loss.
The top two teams in each pool advanced to the Cup competition. The four quarterfinal losers dropped into the bracket for the Plate. The Bowl was contested by the third- and fourth-place finishers in each pool, with the losers in the Bowl quarterfinals dropping into the bracket for the Shield.

Teams
The participating teams are:

Pool stage
The draw was made on December 10, 2011.

All times are local (UTC+13)

Pool A

Pool B

Pool C

Pool D

Knockout stage

Shield

Bowl

Plate

Cup

References

External links

New Zealand Seven Official Site

Wellington Sevens
Wellington
2012